Johannes "Joop" Jacobus Rohner (6 July 1927 – 25 January 2005) was a Dutch water polo goalkeeper who won a bronze medal at the 1948 Summer Olympics.

See also
 Netherlands men's Olympic water polo team records and statistics
 List of Olympic medalists in water polo (men)
 List of men's Olympic water polo tournament goalkeepers

References

External links

 

1927 births
2005 deaths
Water polo players from Amsterdam
Dutch male water polo players
Water polo goalkeepers
Olympic bronze medalists for the Netherlands in water polo
Water polo players at the 1948 Summer Olympics
Medalists at the 1948 Summer Olympics
20th-century Dutch people